Patrick Murphy (born 19 December 1947) is a Welsh former professional footballer who played in the Football League as a right half.

References
General
. Retrieved 20 October 2013.
Specific

1947 births
Living people
Footballers from Merthyr Tydfil
Welsh footballers
Association football wing halves
Cardiff City F.C. players
Merthyr Tydfil F.C. players
English Football League players